Davendra Sharma (born 1 June 1977) is an Indian cricketer. He played fourteen first-class matches for Delhi between 1997 and 2001.

See also
 List of Delhi cricketers

References

External links
 

1977 births
Living people
Indian cricketers
Delhi cricketers
Cricketers from Ghaziabad, Uttar Pradesh